Zoo Family is an Australian children's television series broadcast on the Nine Network on 23 June 1985. The series was produced by Crawford Productions. It was filmed at the Melbourne Zoo. It later premiered on Nickelodeon in the United States in 1987.

Synopsis
Zoo Vet Dr. David Mitchell and his children Nick and Susie make the Royal Melbourne Zoo their home.

Cast
 Peter Curtin as Dr. David 'Mitch' Mitchell
 Steven Jacobson Nicholas Mitchell
 Kate Gorman as Susie Mitchell
 Rebecca Gibney as Julie Davis
 Jon Finlayson as Col. Archibald Spencer
 John Orcsik as Ken Bennett
 Robert Summers as Tim Watson
 Marion Heathfield as Mrs. Spencer

See also
 List of Australian television series

References

External links
 
 http://www.australiantelevision.net/zoofamily.html

Australian children's television series
Nine Network original programming
1985 Australian television series debuts
1980s Nickelodeon original programming
Nickelodeon original programming